Gannansaurus (meaning "Gannan lizard") is an extinct genus of somphospondylan sauropod dinosaur known from the late Late Cretaceous Nanxiong Formation of Ganzhou Basin, Jiangxi Province of southern China. It is known from specimen GMNH F10001 which consists of a single, nearly complete dorsal vertebra and a mid-caudal vertebra. Gannansaurus was first named by Lü Junchang, Yi Laiping, Zhong Hui and Wei Xuefang in 2013 and the type species is Gannansaurus sinensis. Gannansaurus shares some characters with Euhelopus, indicating that it is more closely related to it rather than to other titanosauriforms.

References

Late Cretaceous dinosaurs of Asia
Fossil taxa described in 2013
Macronarians
Paleontology in Jiangxi
Taxa named by Lü Junchang
Ganzhou